Sanicula saxatilis is a rare species of flowering plant in the parsley family known by the common names devil's blacksnakeroot and rock sanicle.

Distribution
It is endemic to the eastern San Francisco Bay Area of California. It is known only from Mount Diablo and Mount Hamilton, both in the Diablo Range.

Its habitat is mostly rocky chaparral slopes and talus. Although it is rare, most occurrences are in remote mountainous locales that are relatively safe from disturbance.

Description
Sanicula saxatilis is a perennial herb producing a thick stem 10 to 25 centimeters tall from a spherical tuber. The leaves are compound, each divided into three leaflets which are deeply cut into serrated lobes. The foliage is green to purple and sometimes waxy in texture.

The inflorescence is made up of one or more heads of bisexual and male-only flowers with tiny, curving, pale salmon pink, yellowish or straw-colored petals.

The fruits are a few millimeters wide and covered in bumps and sometimes bristles.

References

External links
  Calflora Database: Sanicula saxatilis (Diablo sanicle, Devil's blacksnakeroot, Rock sanicle)
Jepson Manual eFlora (TJM2) treatment of ''Sanicula saxatilis'
USDA Plants Profile
U.C. Photos gallery of Sanicula saxatilis images

saxatilis
Endemic flora of California
Diablo Range
Mount Diablo
Taxa named by Edward Lee Greene
Endemic flora of the San Francisco Bay Area